The Ministry of Healthcare of Azerbaijan Republic, also known as Ministry of Health of Azerbaijan Republic is a governmental agency within the Cabinet of Azerbaijan in charge of regulating the healthcare system in Azerbaijan Republic. The ministry is headed by Teymur Musayev (interim).

History
The Ministry of Healthcare was established on June 17, 1918 by the decree of Council of Ministers of Azerbaijan Democratic Republic led by Fatali Khan Khoyski. The first appointed minister was Khudadat Rafibeyli, who had graduated from Kharkov University in 1903 and was the most experienced surgeon in the country at the time.
The ministry consisted of five departments, including city healthcare department, healthcare statistics, therapy, rural healthcare and veterinary offices. The medical care was provided to the population free of charge while the authorities built new hospitals, laboratories, medicine warehouses and purchased medical equipment.
Throughout the 23-month-long existence of Azerbaijan Democratic Republic, 33 hospitals operated in Azerbaijani provinces with each having 1 doctor, 2 paramedics, 1 gynecologist and one nurse conducting vaccinations. According to statistics, there was only one doctor per every 75,000 citizens. Due to the shortage, the Azerbaijani parliament included building of 35 new hospitals and 56 paramedical office in 1920 fiscal budget committing AZN 43,321,950. During the Soviet rule of Azerbaijan, new hospitals and pharmacies were built. State pharmacy and analytical laboratories was established in Baku in order to prepare medicines, bacteriological drugs, syrups and investigate medical records during the issues relating with crime. In 1960-70s, the medical sector was enhanced and new ambulance services opened for public.
The ministry today operates under statute signed by President Heydar Aliyev on December 29, 1998.

The statute of the Ministry of Health 
The presidential decree was signed on May 25, 2006 by Azerbaijani president Ilham Aliyev and covers issues such as the structure and other issues relating with the Ministry of Health of Azerbaijan. Other two statutes accepted in 1998 and 2005 were invalidated after the acceptance of new statute numbered 413. In accordance with the statute the structure of the ministry was submitted and staff of the chairmanship was defined as 87 people.

Structure
Main functions of the ministry are organization and regulation of healthcare system in the country to provide sufficient medical care to the population; preparation and implementation of state healthcare programs; conduct activities for improvement of services by medical companies in both state and private sector; regulation of sanitary-epidemiology stations in the country; preparation of programs on parenthood and family planning; provision of medical drugs, bacteriological and antivirus products to hospitals; regulations and development of pharmacy offices networks; research and development of medical equipment manufacturing; prevention of dangerous diseases in the country and so forth.

International relations 
In order of improvement of healthcare in the country, Ministry of Healthcare Azerbaijan cooperates with a number of international organizations and shares experiences with foreign countries.

Rostrapovich-Vishnevskaya Foundation 
During the years of 2010-2012 the Ministry of Healthcare of Azerbaijan cooperated with Rostrapovich-Vishnevskaya Foundation. Parties signed an agreement on “Diagnosis of pregnant women against HepB and HIV viruses and prevention of newborn against HepB.” At the same time, ministry organized an immunization campaign and vaccine program with support of foundation. As a result, indications of the diseases such as measles, mumps and parotid decreased in the country.

World Health Organization 
Since 2006 Ministry of Healthcare Azerbaijan has been represented on European Region’s Standing Committee of the Regional Committee and twice on WHO’s Executive Board. 61st session of the WHO Regional Committee for Europe was held in Azerbaijan in 2011. During the meeting public health experts and ministers of health from 53 countries signed an agreement relating to the public health problems and current health threats in European region. At the same time, Health 2020 – a new European Health Policy Framework was also discussed during the session and accepted Sustainable Development Agenda 2030. Country office of the World Health Organization in Azerbaijan was established in June 1994 in Baku. The office carries out implementation of WHO programs in the country with staff consists of six people.

Since 2006 Azerbaijan has started HIV treatment services in the country with the support of WHO. Current prior programs are carried out in the field of healthcare such as, noncommunicable diseases, maternal and child health, health system strengthening, tuberculosis, immunization and tobacco control.

Organization of Islamic Cooperation 
Ministry of Healthcare Azerbaijan cooperates with the member countries of OIC and participates in sessions of ministries of health. The third Islamic Conference of Ministries of Health was held in Kazakhstan on September 29, 2011. The minister of healthcare Oktay Shiraliyev also participated in three days last session. Ministers of health from 53 member countries and representatives from international organizations participated in the meeting. During the session discussions were carried out relating to the developments and cooperative works between member countries, prevention of infectious and non-infectious diseases and improving the potential of health workers and equipment.

See also
Cabinet of Azerbaijan
Healthcare in Azerbaijan
Azerbaijan State Medical University

References

Healthcare
Azerbaijan
Azerbaijan, Healthcare
1918 establishments in Azerbaijan